Cannabis is a 1970 crime film directed by Pierre Koralnik. It is a co-production between France, West Germany and Italy. It stars Serge Gainsbourg, Jane Birkin, Paul Nicholas and Curd Jürgens.

Cast
 Serge Gainsbourg as Serge Morgan
 Jane Birkin as Jane
 Paul Nicholas as Paul
 Curd Jürgens as Henri Emery
 Gabriele Ferzetti as Inspector Bardeche
  as Lancan
 Yvette Lebon as Emerys Mätresse 
 Laurence Badie as Madame Carbona
 Rita Renoir
 Mario Brega

Release
Cannabis was released in France on September 2, 1970. It was released in Italy on February 2, 1973.

See also
Cannabis (film score)

References

External links

1970 films
1970 crime films
French crime films
Italian crime films
West German films
Films based on crime novels
Films based on French novels
Police detective films
Films scored by Serge Gainsbourg
1970s Italian films
1970s French films